Robert A. Garside (born c. 1929) was a Canadian football player who played for the Hamilton Tiger-Cats and Ottawa Rough Riders. He won the Grey Cup with Hamilton in 1953 and retired in 1955 due to injury (torn knee ligaments). He previously played football at and attended the University of Toronto. In 1957, he became the head coach of the Brantford Tiger-Cat Bees in the Ontario Rugby Football Union after serving as an assistant the prior year.

References

1920s births
Hamilton Tiger-Cats players
Possibly living people